The 1937–38 Kangaroo tour was the sixth Kangaroo tour, in which the Australian national rugby league team travelled to New Zealand, Great Britain and France and played thirty-eight matches, including the Ashes series of three Test matches against Great Britain, and two Test matches each against the Kiwis and French. It followed the tour of 1933-34. Following a cessation of overseas international tours due to World War II, the next tour was staged in 1948-49.

The squad's leadership 
The team was selected with Wally Prigg as captain and Jack Reardon as vice-captain. Tour co-managers were Harry Sunderland and Robert Savage.

Touring squad 
The Rugby League News published headshots of the touring party, including the managers, in successive issues: July 3, July 10, and July 17. The names, weight and height of the players was also published. 
Collins, Gilbert, Heidke, McLean, Reardon, Robison, and Whittle were selected from Queensland clubs. Dawson, Gibbs, Hazelton, Prigg and Bert Williams were selected from clubs in New South Wales Country areas. The balance of the squad had played for Sydney-based clubs during the 1937 season.

Notes: 
 Tallies in the table below are compiled from match reports that appeared in Australian newspapers. Most articles were provided by the Australian Associated Press and were amended by local editors. Claude Corbett was present for the England leg of the tour, reporting for The Sun, Sydney and the Telegraph, Brisbane. Tour Manager Harry Sunderland provided articles for The Courier-Mail, Brisbane. 
 For nearly all matches, one or more newspapers listed the Australian team with the match report. An exception is the match against Catalans. The point-scorers in the Catalans match include two players who were not named in the team prior to the match. Consequently, 15 players are included in the tallies for the Catalans match. 
 Under the rules of the time, teams were limited to 13 players, with no ability to replace injured players.  
 Following a broken leg injury to Joe Pearce, sustained during the Second Test match in New Zealand, Herb Narvo was added to the squad. Narvo travelled to England separately from the touring party. Joe Pearce was permitted to continue with the group, and he travelled with the team to England and France.

Nez Zealand leg

1st Test

2nd Test

England leg 
Matches scheduled in December 1937 against Castleford, Cumberland, Hull Kingston Rovers and Hunslet were abandoned or cancelled due to snow or fog.

1st Test

2nd Test

3rd Test

France leg 
Four years previously, the Kangaroos had travelled to France to play an international against England, in Paris, on New Year's Eve, 1933. On this tour, Australia played rugby league matches against French teams for the first time. France had played their first international against England in April 1934. Matches involving France against England and Wales had followed in the 1934-35, 1935-36 and 1936-37 European Championships. The 1st Test against Australia was France's 8th Test Match.

1st Test

2nd Test

References

External links 
 1937-38 Kangaroo Tour at Rugby League Project

Australia national rugby league team tours
Rugby league tours of Great Britain
Rugby league tours of France
Kangaroo tour
Kangaroo tour